The 1910 Manitoba general election was held on July 11, 1910 to elect members of the Legislative Assembly of the Province of Manitoba, Canada.

The result was a fourth consecutive majority government for the Conservative Party of Manitoba, led by premier Rodmond Roblin.  Roblin's electoral machine won 28 seats, against 13 for the opposition Manitoba Liberal Party under new leader Tobias Norris.

The Manitoba Labour Party ran a single candidate: Fred Dixon, who was almost elected in Winnipeg Centre with unofficial support from the Liberal Party.  Many believe  that Dixon was defeated by the Socialist Party's decision to field a candidate against him.  The Socialists ran two other candidates in Winnipeg, and both were defeated.

All the members were elected through First-past-the-post voting in single member districts. This was the last election to be conducted that way in Manitoba for 40 years. The next 11 elections involved the election of some MLAs in multi-member districts.

Results

Riding results 
(incumbent) or boldface denotes incumbent.

Arthur:
Amos Lyle (C) 777
(incumbent)John Williams (L) 602

Assiniboia:
(incumbent)Aime Benard (C) 924
R.A. Bonnar (L[?]) 322
John Colvin (Ind-L-Lab) 66

Avondale:
(incumbent)James Argue (C) 708    
J. Madill (L) 626

Beautiful Plains:
(incumbent)James H. Howden (C) accl.

Birtle:
(incumbent)George Malcolm (L) 758
E. Graham (C) 648

Brandon City:
(incumbent)George Coldwell (C) 1402
S.H. McKay (L) 1150

Carillon:
(incumbent)Albert Prefontaine (C) 619  
Horace Chevrier (L) 544

Cypress:
(incumbent)George Steel (C) 875
F.H. Mitchell (L) 699

Dauphin:
James G. Harvey (C) 1107
(incumbent)John A. Campbell (L) 1054

Deloraine:
John C.W. Reid (C) 743
(incumbent)Robert S. Thornton (L) 737

Dufferin:
(incumbent)Rodmond Roblin (C) 1267
W.F. Osborne (L) 811

Emerson:
David McFadden (C) 766
(incumbent)George Walton (L) 757

Gilbert Plains:
Sam Hughes (C) 970
W. Shaw (L) 865

Gimli:
Baldwin Baldwinson (C) 900
Wilhelm Paulson (L) 450
X.J. Solmundson (Ind) 287

Gladstone:
(incumbent)James W. Armstrong (L) 957
W. McKelvey (C) 777

Hamiota:
(incumbent)William Ferguson (C) 848
E. Henry (L) 751

Kildonan and St. Andrews:
(incumbent)Orton Grain (C) 1131
A.R. Bredin (L) 1043

Killarney:
(incumbent)George Lawrence (C) 726
G. Robinson (L) 519

Lakeside:
Charles Duncan McPherson (L) 570
(incumbent)Edwin D. Lynch (C) 502

Lansdowne:
(incumbent)Tobias Norris (L) 1196
W. Fenwick (C) 944

La Veredrye:
William Molloy (L) 439
(incumbent)Jean-Baptiste Lauzon (C) 430

Manitou:
(incumbent)Robert Rogers (C) 1065
J.E. Gayton (L) 610

Minnedosa:
John Thompson (L) 971
(incumbent)William B. Waddell (C) 937

Morden:
(incumbent)Benjamin McConnell (L) 630
J.A. Hobbs (C) 586

Morris:
(incumbent)Colin Campbell (C) 746
R.L. Ross (L) 573

Mountain:
(incumbent)James Bryson Baird (L) 1086
E.L. Taylor (C) 804

Norfolk:
(incumbent)Robert Lyons (C) 822
Frank Avery (L) 647

Portage la Prairie:
(incumbent)Hugh Armstrong (C) 912
Ewan McPherson (L) 711

Rhineland:
(incumbent)Valentine Winkler (L) 520
Hugh McGavin (C) 387

Rockwood:
(incumbent)Isaac Riley (C) 792
Ira Stratton (L) 738

Russell:
(incumbent)Angus Bonnycastle (C) 900
W.V. Valens (L) 892

South Brandon:
(incumbent)Alfred Carroll (C) 535
E.H. Dewart (L) 525

Springfield:
(incumbent)Donald A. Ross (L) 807
C.P. Fullerton (C) 661

Swan River:
Daniel D. McDonald (L) 465
(incumbent)James W. Robson (C) 436

St. Boniface:
(incumbent)Joseph Bernier (C) 1022
A. Dubuc (L) 760

Turtle Mountain:
(incumbent)James Johnson (C) 742
W. Hanley (L) 580

Virden:
(incumbent)Harvey Simpson (C) 985
D. McDonald (L) 800

Winnipeg Centre:

Winnipeg North:
Solomon Hart Green (L) 2175
(incumbent)John F. Mitchell (C) 1555
Ed. Fulcher (SPC) 892

Winnipeg South:
Lendrum McMeans (C) 2545
Edward Brown (L) 2496

Winnipeg West:
(incumbent)Thomas Herman Johnson (L) 2578
A.J. Andrews (C) 2538
George Armstrong (SPC) 246

Post-election changes
Russell (res. Angus Bonnycastle, 1911), February 4, 1911:
Frederic Newton (C) 916
William Valens (L) 651

Killarney (George Lawrence appointed to cabinet, October 11, 1911), October 23, 1911:
George Lawrence (C) accl.

Manitou (res. Robert Rogers, October 10, 1911), October 31, 1911:
James Morrow (C) accl.

The Pas (new constituency), October 12, 1912:
Robert Orok (C) accl.

Gimli (res. Baldwin Baldwinson, 1913), May 12, 1913:
Edmund Taylor (C) 1674
A. Eggerston (L) 832

St. Boniface (Joseph Bernier appointed to cabinet, 1913), May 22, 1913:
Joseph Bernier (C) accl.

Kildonan and St. Andrews (res. Orton Grain, 1913), November 29, 1913:
Walter Humphries Montague (C) 1123
A.N. Bredin (L) 753

Notes and references

Further reading
 

1910 elections in Canada
1910
1910 in Manitoba
July 1910 events